Echiomima mythica is a moth in the family Xyloryctidae. It was described by Edward Meyrick in 1890. It is found in Australia,<ref>{{cite web |editor-last=Savela |editor-first=Markku |date=14 December 2013 |url=https://www.nic.funet.fi/pub/sci/bio/life/insecta/lepidoptera/ditrysia/gelechioidea/xyloryctidae/echiomima/#mythica |title=Echiomima mythica (Meyrick, 1890) |website=Lepidoptera and Some Other Life Forms |accessdate=27 August 2020}}</ref> where it has been recorded from New South Wales and Queensland.

The wingspan is 30–41 mm. The forewings are pale ochreous, towards the inner and hind margin somewhat brownish tinged. The costa and inner margin are narrowly suffused with yellowish brown and there is a round black dot in the disc at two-thirds. The hindwings are light ochreous orange.

The larvae feed on Ellatostachys xylocarpa, Cleistanthus cunninghamii, Waterhousea floribunda, Backhousia myrtifolia, Pongamia pinnata, Elaeocarpus angustifolius, Daphnandra species and Carya illinoensis''. They bore in the stem of their host plant.

References

Xyloryctidae
Moths described in 1890